Eocaiman is an extinct genus of caiman containing species living from the Early Paleocene to Miocene in what is now Argentina (Salamanca and Sarmiento Formations), Itaboraí Formation of Brazil and Colombia (Honda Group). Eocaiman contains three described species: E. cavernensis, E. palaeocenicus, and E. itaboraiensis, and is typically recovered as one of the more basal members of Caimaninae. Notocaiman was synonymized with Eocaiman paleocenicus in 2022.

References

Further reading 
 The Osteology of the Reptiles (page 605)

External links 
 Eocaiman in the Paleobiology Database

Alligatoridae
Prehistoric pseudosuchian genera
Paleocene crocodylomorphs
Eocene crocodylomorphs
Miocene crocodylomorphs
Paleocene reptiles of South America
Eocene reptiles of South America
Miocene reptiles of South America
Paleogene Argentina
Fossils of Argentina
Golfo San Jorge Basin
Paleogene Brazil
Fossils of Brazil
Neogene Colombia
Fossils of Colombia
Honda Group, Colombia
Fossil taxa described in 1933
Taxa named by George Gaylord Simpson
Itaboraí Formation
Sarmiento Formation
Salamanca Formation